Ninoy Aquino Avenue is a north–south collector road that links Pasay and Parañaque in southern Metro Manila, Philippines. It serves as an extension to Dr. Santos Avenue (formerly Sucat Road) and as a feeder road to Ninoy Aquino International Airport (NAIA) from the south and the east. Like the airport it passes through, it is named after Senator Benigno "Ninoy" Aquino Jr.

Route description

The road commences at the junction with A. Bonifacio Street and the road into Amvel City in Barangay San Dionisio, Parañaque as a continuation of Dr. Santos Avenue. It then travels north toward the old NAIA Terminal 1, traversing Barangays La Huerta and Santo Niño. Notable landmarks include the Dampa Seafood Market, the former Casino Filipino Airport, and Duty Free Fiestamall. It then enters Pasay where it is also known by its former name Imelda Avenue, after former Filipina first lady Imelda Marcos. The avenue terminates at the intersection with NAIA Road near the ramps of the NAIA Expressway.

Intersections

References

Streets in Metro Manila